Temnikow Nunataks is a scattered group of low rock outcroppings over an area of about 6 nautical miles (11 km), located at the east margin of Dyer Plateau and 5 nautical miles (9 km) west of Kelley Massif in Palmer Land, in the Antarctic Peninsula. Mapped by the United States Geological Survey (USGS) in 1974. Named by Advisory Committee on Antarctic Names (US-ACAN) for Nicolas Temnikow, a United States Antarctic Research Program (USARP) biologist at Palmer Station in 1974.

Nunataks of Palmer Land